Hauk may refer to:

 A. Andrew Hauk (1912–2004), US federal judge
 Angelo Hauk (born 1984), Italian–German footballer 
 Bob Hauk, fictional character in  the 1981 American film Escape from New York
 Minnie Hauk (1851–1929), American operatic singer
 Peter Hauk (born 1960), German politician
 Thomas Hauk, fictional character on the HBO drama The Wire
 Hauk Aabel (1869–1961), Norwegian comedian and actor
 Hauk Buen (born 1933), Norwegian hardingfele fiddler and fiddle maker

See also 
 Hauk-class patrol boat, a series of Norwegian fast attack craft
 Kjeller Hauk, a Norwegian biplane model from 1923 to 1929